Abdelhadi Belkhayat (born 1940) is a Moroccan singer of Arabo-Andalusian and popular Moroccan music. He is mostly remembered for his song "Ya bent Nass" which has since been made famous again by many young Moroccan and Arab artists, also his music has been featured in several films from Morocco.

Personal 
His Family, originates from Fes, Morocco. He left his hometown to settle in Casablanca.

After such successful albums like "Ya Bent Nass", "Ya Dak L'insane", "Qitar Al Hayat" and "Alkamaro al-ahmar". He also released a spiritual-themed song "Al Mounfarija" based on Ibn Al Nahawi's famous poem as a response to king Hassan II request.

See also 
 Abdelwahab Doukkali
 Mohamed Rouicha

References

External links 
 ya bent ness song
 Alkamaro Al-ahmar

1940 births
Moroccan musicians
Living people